The Mobile 150 presented by Sports Authority was a NASCAR K&N Pro Series East race held at Mobile International Speedway in Irvington, Alabama.

History
A. J. McCarron served as grand marshal for the inaugural race. Tyler Dippel won the inaugural race, which ran long due to a late restart.

Past winners

 2016: Race extended due to overtime.
 2016: Race postponed from Saturday to Sunday due to rain.

References

External links
 

2016 in NASCAR
ARCA Menards Series East
Former NASCAR races
Motorsport in Alabama